Kolawole Oyelola Agodirin (born 2 March 1983) is a Nigerian footballer. He currently plays for A.S.D MODICA CALCIO.

Biography
Agodirin was signed by Venezia in August 2002. He was loaned to Serie C2 club Mantova in 2003–04 season. He then left for Latina in a co-ownership deal with Venezia. After Venezia went bankrupt, Agodirin remained at Latina but only played 5 league matches, starting from the 5th round counting from the end. In 2006–07 Serie C2 season, he was signed by Andria. He then played for Olbia and Viterbese.

In 2008, Agodirin left for Lega Pro Prima Divisione club SPAL. On 1 February 2010, he was signed by Como.

In August 2010, Agodirin was signed by Foggia.

On 31 January 2012, he moved to Latina He was part of the squad that gain promotion to Serie B as well as winning the Coppa Italia for Lega Pro clubs in 2013. On 9 September 2013, he joined Casertana as a free agent. In the 2015–2016, season playing for Catanzaro. In the summer 2016, signing for Bisceglie to move, in January 2017, to Sambenedettese.

References

External links
 Football.it Profile 
 Foggia Profile 

Nigerian footballers
Nigerian expatriate footballers
Venezia F.C. players
Mantova 1911 players
S.S. Fidelis Andria 1928 players
U.S. Viterbese 1908 players
S.P.A.L. players
Como 1907 players
Calcio Foggia 1920 players
Association football forwards
People from Kwara State
Expatriate footballers in Italy
Nigerian expatriate sportspeople in Italy
1983 births
Yoruba sportspeople
Living people